Tan Sri Dato' Seri Haji Abu Hassan bin Omar (15 September 1940 – 8 September 2018) was a Malaysian politician from United Malays National Organisation (UMNO), a major component party of Barisan Nasional (BN) coalition. He was the 12th Menteri Besar (Chief Minister) of Selangor, Malaysia, from 1997 to 2000. Previously he was also the Minister of Social Welfare (1984–1986), Minister of Federal Territories (1986–1987), Minister of Foreign Affairs (1987–1992) and Minister of Domestic Trade and Consumer Affairs (1992–1997). He was also a former Member of Parliament for Kuala Selangor (1978–1997) and Selangor state assemblyman for Permatang (1997–1999) in Selangor.

Early life
Abu Hassan was born on 15 September 1940 in Bukit Belimbing, Kuala Selangor, Selangor. He received his early education at the Malay School of Bukit Belimbing (1946–1950) before furthering his studies at Klang High School (1951–1957), Malay College Kuala Kangsar (1958–1959) and University of Hull, England (1960–1963 and 1971–1973). Abu Hassan was married to Wan Nor Daud and the couple had five children.

Before entering politics, he served as Administration and Diplomatic Officer (ADO) from 1964 to 1978. He previously served as Chief Assistant Secretary of Economy Planning Unit in the Prime Minister's department, Assistant Secretary of Selangor State Government and Assistant Secretary of the Land and Federal Territory Development Ministry.

Political career
Abu Hassan started his political career when he contested and won the Kuala Selangor parliamentary seat in the 1978 general election on 8 July 1978. He successfully retained the seat in the subsequent 1982, 1986, 1990 and 1995 general elections. In government, he was also the Minister of Social Welfare (1984–1986), Minister of Federal Territories (1986–1987), Minister of Foreign Affairs (1987–1992) and Minister of Domestic Trade and Consumer Affairs (1992–1997).

On 30 April 1997, he resigned as Member of Parliament for Kuala Selangor and his cabinet minister post in order to contest the Selangor state seat of Permatang which fell vacant when its incumbent assemblyman, Jamaluddin Adnan also resigned. This arranged position swap occurred to enable him to be appointed the new Selangor Menteri Besar, to replace Muhammad Muhammad Taib who stepped down over currency irregularities court charges and controversies.

Menteri Besar of Selangor
After being elected as a representative of the Selangor State Legislative Assembly in the by-election on 29 May 1997, he was appointed as the Menteri Besar of Selangor from 6 June 1997 to 9 August 2000. There was controversy over the RM5 million expenditure to renovate the official residence of the Menteri Besar at Bukit Megawati, Shah Alam for Abu Hassan during his tenure.

In 2000, a poison pen letter started circulating about an alleged sex scandal and ill-concealed relationship between Abu Hassan with his wife's sister. Abu Hassan had denied any wrongdoing, claiming his sister-in-law actually had married his good friend, a Chinese new Muslim convert (Muallaf) who coincidentally shared his Islamic name; Abu Hassan Tan Abdullah. He stated that as the reason their son's name was Mohamad Hafiz bin Abu Hassan, which had caused all the confusion. The opposition had reported the case to the Selangor Islamic Religious Department (JAIS) demanding an investigation into their relationship and if they have an illegitimate son under religious law.

On 10 August 2000, Abu Hassan abruptly announced his resignation as Menteri Besar of Selangor citing health and family reasons but did not elaborate on other existing controversies and crisis bothering him.

Death
Abu Hassan died of a cardiac arrest on 8 September 2018 at 8.05pm at the Columbia Asia Hospital, Bukit Rimau, aged 77. Abu Hassan's remains were brought to his residence at Kota Kemuning, Shah Alam before brought to the Sultan Salahuddin Abdul Aziz Mosque, Shah Alam for prayers and then burial at Shah Alam Royal Mausoleum, Shah Alam, Selangor on the next day. Sultan Selangor, Sultan Sharafuddin Idris Shah and Tengku Permaisuri Selangor, Tengku Permaisuri Norashikin attended the ceremony.

Election results

Honours

Honours of Malaysia
  :
  Member of the Order of the Defender of the Realm (AMN) (1975)
  Commander of the Order of Loyalty to the Crown of Malaysia (PSM) – Tan Sri (2004)
  :
  Knight Commander of the Order of the Crown of Selangor (DPMS) – Dato' (1981)
  Knight Grand Commander of the Order of the Crown of Selangor (SPMS) – Dato' Seri (1988)
  :
  Grand Knight of the Order of the Territorial Crown (SUMW) – Datuk Seri Utama (2012)
  :
  Companion of the Order of the Crown of Terengganu (SMT)
  :
  Recipient of the Sultan Ibrahim Medal (PIS)

References

1940 births
2018 deaths
People from Selangor
Malaysian people of Malay descent
Malaysian Muslims
United Malays National Organisation politicians
Members of the Dewan Rakyat
Members of the Selangor State Legislative Assembly
Selangor state executive councillors
Chief Ministers of Selangor
Government ministers of Malaysia
Foreign ministers of Malaysia
Commanders of the Order of Loyalty to the Crown of Malaysia
21st-century Malaysian politicians
Knights Grand Commander of the Order of the Crown of Selangor
Knights Commander of the Order of the Crown of Selangor
Members of the Order of the Defender of the Realm